Trichaptum imbricatum is a species of fungus in the family Polyporaceae. It is distinguished by its imbricate basidiocarps, white to cream hymenophores, small and regular pores, and scattered and thin-walled cystidia. It was first isolated from China.

References

Further reading
Dai, Yu-Cheng, et al. "Wood-inhabiting fungi in southern China. 4. Polypores from Hainan Province." Annales Botanici Fennici. Vol. 48. No. 3. Finnish Zoological and Botanical Publishing Board, 2011.
Mihál, Ivan. "Species diversity, abundance and dominance of macromycetes in beech forest stands with different intensity of shelterwood cutting interventions." (2008).
Hibbett, David S., and Manfred Binder. "Evolution of complex fruiting–body morphologies in homobasidiomycetes." Proceedings of the Royal Society of London B: Biological Sciences 269.1504 (2002): 1963–1969.

External links

Polyporaceae
Fungi of China
Fungi described in 2009
Taxa named by Yu-Cheng Dai
Taxa named by Bao-Kai Cui